Furcifer verrucosus, also known as the warty chameleon, spiny chameleon or crocodile chameleon, is a species of small reptile endemic to Madagascar. It was first described by Georges Cuvier in 1829.

Taxonomy
There are two subspecies, Furcifer v. verrucosus and Furcifer v. semicristatus, the latter being found mainly in the southernmost part of the island. This chameleon is closely related to Oustalet's chameleon Furcifer oustaleti (Malagasy giant chameleon), the pair forming a species complex, but each member of the group may be a cryptic species (two species indistinguishable in the field and currently believed to be a single species) and the exact taxonomical relationship between members of the group is unclear.

Description
On its head it has a casque, a helmet-like crest formed from scales. A small crest runs along a raised ridge from its eyes to its snout. There are further low crests running along the flanks, down the throat and along the belly. A distinctive crest of up to forty  spines runs along the back in males but this is cut short in females, continuing along the spine as tubercles. Both sexes have a row of large scales forming a lateral line. The long tail is prehensile. The general colour of this chameleon is grey or brown variously blotched or indistinctly banded, with a white intermittent streak along each side. Females are usually paler in colour and males are often tinged with green on the belly, tail and limbs.

Distribution and habitat
The warty chameleon is found only on the island of Madagascar including Manderano in the Tulear region. It occurs over much of the west part of the island and in drier parts of the south. It is seldom found in primary rainforest but favours arid disturbed land, including near the sea. It is a terrestrial species and also climbs around in low bushes. In hot weather it sometimes retreats into a sandy burrow to keep cool.

Biology
The warty chameleon feeds largely on insects which it catches with its long sticky tongue. The female lays one clutch of 30 to 60 eggs a year and these are incubated for about 200 days. They hatch into juvenile chameleons which may take six months to a year to become mature.

References

Furcifer
Endemic fauna of Madagascar
Reptiles of Madagascar
Reptiles described in 1829
Taxa named by Georges Cuvier